Ormomyces is a genus of fungi in the family Laboulbeniaceae. This is a monotypic genus, containing the single species Ormomyces clivinae.

References

External links
Ormomyces at Index Fungorum

Laboulbeniaceae
Monotypic Laboulbeniomycetes genera
Laboulbeniales genera